Kopecky (formerly the Kopecky Family Band) is an American indie-rock band formed in Nashville, Tennessee in 2007. The band consists of Kelsey Kopecky (vocals, keyboards, and bass), Gabe Simon (vocals, guitar, and horns), Steven Holmes (guitar, lap steel guitar), David Krohn (drums), Markus Midkiff (cello, guitar, and keyboards), and Corey Oxendine (bass, guitar, and horns). Their debut album, Kids Raising Kids, was released in October 2012 and then rereleased by ATO Records in April 2013.

The group's second album, Drug for the Modern Age, was released on May 19, 2015, via ATO Records.

History
The band originated when its founders, Kelsey Kopecky and Gabe Simon, met while attending the Belmont University in Nashville, Tennessee. They met lead guitarist Steven Holmes, bassist Corey Oxendine, cellist Markus Midkiff, and drummer David Krohn a couple of months later. Within a year they had released their first EP, Embraces in 2007, followed by The Disaster and Of Epic Proportions in 2010. That year, they were spotted by Bob Boilen of NPR at CMJ 2010. After 18 months of touring, the band released their debut album, Kids Raising Kids. The album was picked up and rereleased by ATO Records in April 2013 after the band signed with them in December 2012. The album features their Top 10 radio hit "Heartbeat" and has been cited in magazines such as The New York Times and Paste.

Since their formation, Kopecky has toured in the United States and Canada and has performed in music festivals such as Bonnaroo, Firefly Music Festival, Austin City Limits Music Festival, Lollapalooza, Outside Lands, Bumbershoot, South by Southwest, LouFest, and Paper City Music Festival. They have toured with artists such as Devotchka, Givers, Gomez, Michael Franti & Spearhead, Gogol Bordello, Milo Greene, The Lumineers, The Mowgli's and Lissie.

On December 17, 2014, the band announced on their Facebook page that they're "shortening things up a bit...keeping it simple". The photographed hand-written note further reads, "As we look forward to 2015, we await the release of our sophomore album with new music, we will be shortening our name to KOPECKY!"

A second album, titled Drug for the Modern Age, was released on May 19, 2015 via ATO Records.

Media appearances
Kopecky made their first big press appearance on Paste (magazine)'s Top 25 Best Live Acts of 2011  and The 25 Best New Bands of 2011. They were featured in the Booming section of the New York Times in 2013 and have had numerous appearances in American Songwriter. The band has an "On The Verge" feature in USA Today and their music video for "Change" premiered at Elle. "Heartbeat" hit #5 on Triple A Radio Chart and "Are You Listening" is currently breaking into Top 25 at Triple A Radio Chart. The band's music video for "Hope" premiered at MTV Hive and they will be performing at the MTV "O Music Awards" overlooking Times Square. Kopecky is also featured on an NPR Tiny Desk Concert.

Kopecky's music has also been featured on various television shows such as Grey's Anatomy on ABC, Royal Pains on USA,  Parenthood on NBC, The Vampire Diaries on The CW, Awkward on MTV, Beauty & The Beast on The CW, and College Game Day on ESPN.

Kopecky has been featured in the news on The Nashville Scene, Last.fm, and NPR Music due to their debut album, Kids Raising Kids.

The band made their major television debut on July 31, 2013 with an appearance on The Tonight Show with Jay Leno. They performed "Heartbeat".

Discography

Album

Extended plays

Singles

Music Videos

References

External links
Official website

2007 establishments in Tennessee
Indie rock musical groups from Tennessee
Musical groups established in 2007
Musical groups from Nashville, Tennessee